Baranavichy District is a district of Brest Region, in Belarus. Its administrative center is Baranavichy.

Demographics
At the time of the Belarus Census (2009), Baranavichy District had a population of 41,902. Of these, 86.9% were of Belarusian, 5.9% Polish, 5.2% Russian and 1.1% Ukrainian ethnicity. 81.6% spoke Belarusian and 16.6% Russian as their native language.

Notable residents 

Adam Mickiewicz (1798, Zavosse village – 1855), poet, dramatist, essayist, publicist and translator

Jan (Ivan) Sierada (1879, Zadzveja village — 1943), Belarusian statesman, writer, first president of the Belarusian Democratic Republic

References

 
Districts of Brest Region